Ministry of Information and Broadcasting (Ministry of I&B) is a ministerial level agency of the Government of India responsible for the formulation and administration of rules, regulations and laws in the areas of information, broadcasting, the press and the Cinema of India.

The Ministry is responsible for the administration of Prasar Bharati, the broadcasting arm of the Indian Government. The Central Board of Film Certification is the other important statutory body under this ministry being responsible for the regulation of motion pictures broadcast in India.

Organisation
 Broadcasting
 Conditional Access System (CAS)
 Community Radio Stations
 Prasar Bharati
 Doordarshan
 Akashvani (All India Radio)
 Broadcast Engineering Consultants India Limited
 Uplinking / Downlinking of TV Channels
 Content Regulation on Private TV Channels
 Direct to Home (DTH)
 Internet Protocol Television (IPTV)
 Headend-in-the-Sky (HITS)
Digital television transition
Radio And Television Licence Around The World
Broadcasting Authority of India 1977
Information
Directorate of Advertising and Visual Publicity (DAVP),Central Bureau of Communication(CBC)
 Directorate of Field Publicity
 Photo Division
 Publications Division
 Research Reference and Training Division
 Song and Drama Division
 Office of the Registrar of Newspapers for India (RNI)
 Press Council of India
 Press Information Bureau (PIB)
 Indian Institute of Mass Communication (IIMC)
 Films
 Central Board of Film Certification
 Film and Television Institute of India, Pune (FTII)
 Film Certification Appellate Tribunal
 Satyajit Ray Film and Television Institute (SRFTI)
 National Film Development Corporation

Mandate 
The mandate of the Ministry of Information & Broadcasting are:
News Services through All India Radio (AIR) and Doordarshan (DD) for the people.
Development of broadcasting and television.
Import and export of films.
Development and promotion of film industry.
Organisation of film festivals and cultural exchanges for the purpose.
Directorate of Advertising and visual publicity DAVP
Handling of press relations to present the policies of Government of India and to get feedback on the Government policies.
Administration of the Press and Registration of Books Act, 1867 in respect to newspapers.
Dissemination of information about India within and outside the country through publications on matters of national importance.
Research, Reference and Training to assist the media units of the Ministry to meet their responsibilities.
Use of interpersonal communication and traditional folk art forms for information publicity campaigns on public interest issues.
International cooperation in the field of information and mass media.

List of Ministers

List of Ministers of State

See also 
Censor Board of India
Indian Information Service

References

External links
 Official website of the Ministry of Information and Broadcasting
MIB on twitter
MIB on Facebook

 
Mass media in India
India
Information and Broadcasting